Hohn Air Base is a military air base in Germany. It was home to the Lufttransportgeschwader 63 (LTG 63 for short, Air Transport Wing 63 in English) of the German Air Force (Luftwaffe).

Usage
Since May 1968 the Transall C-160 has been operated from the base. During 2013 Air Transport Wing 63 was disbanded and subsequently it was announced that the air base would be given up by the German Air Force. However they announced in 2019 the airfield would be kept open as a diversion facility for air bases in Northern Germany.

References

Bases of the German Air Force
Airports in Schleswig-Holstein